The Monument to Bravo Murillo is an instance of public art in Madrid, Spain.

History and description 

An inscription read then:  ("To Bravo Murillo, the Town of Madrid, 17 May 1902").

The original version of the monument had a total height of 8.00 m. The bronze statue represents a standing Bravo Murillo. The original pedestal was made of marble and stone. It features an allegorical female figure embodying the town (villa) of Madrid holding the municipal coat of arms, while two lateral bronze reliefs on the plinth represent Commerce and Industry.

Following the revamp of the glorieta de Bilbao decided in 1961, the monument was removed and, upon request from the Canal de Isabel II, it was relocated next to the main headquarters of the later company at the meeting of the streets of Bravo Murillo and José Abascal, yet when the monument was unveiled for a second time on 17 December 1963 it had lost the original plinth in the process.

The new inscription read: . Eventually, the date would be changed again to 1803–1873, the lifetime of Bravo Murillo.

A detached limestone wall dedicated to Bravo Murillo and funded by the Association of Plumbing Employers of Madrid (ASEFOSAM) was erected later behind the statue.

References 
Citations

Bibliography
 

Monuments and memorials in Madrid
Outdoor sculptures in Madrid
Sculptures of men in Spain
Murillo, Bravo
Buildings and structures in Ríos Rosas neighborhood, Madrid
1900 sculptures
Statues of politicians
Bronze sculptures in Spain